James Harding LaMarque (July 29, 1921 – January 15, 2000), also nicknamed "Lefty", was an American baseball pitcher in the Negro leagues. He played from 1942 to 1951 with the Kansas City Monarchs. He also played with the Diablos Rojos del México of the Mexican League in 1950.

References

External links
 and Seamheads
Negro League Baseball Players Association

1931 births
2000 deaths
Kansas City Monarchs players
Baseball players from Missouri
People from Potosi, Missouri
20th-century African-American sportspeople
Baseball pitchers